Orlando Bezerra de Menezes Airport  is the airport serving Juazeiro do Norte, Brazil. It is named after a local politician and entrepreneur.

It is operated by AENA.

History
The airport has been operated by Infraero since 2002 but on March 15, 2019 AENA won a 30-year concession to operate the airport.

Airlines and destinations

Access

See also

List of airports in Brazil

References

External links

Airports in Ceará
Juazeiro do Norte